Perkins Hollow is a valley in Wayne County in the U.S. state of Missouri. It bears the name of John Perkins, an early settler.

References

Valleys of Wayne County, Missouri
Valleys of Missouri